The red codling or hoka (Pseudophycis bachus) is a morid cod of the genus Pseudophycis, restricted to  New Zealand, from the surface to 700 m. A closely related species is found in Australia.  Its length is up to 90 cm. P. bachus is a food source for the diving yellow-eyed penguin, Megadyptes antipodes.

Red Cod is in the unsustainable section of the Forest & Bird Best Fish Guide, and near the middle of the table overall.

Notes

References

Sources
 
 Tony Ayling & Geoffrey Cox (1982). Collins Guide to the Sea Fishes of New Zealand. Auckland, New Zealand: William Collins Publishers. .

red codling
Fauna of Victoria (Australia)
Fish of New Zealand
red codling